Emmanuel Christian Academy may refer to:

In the United States
Emmanuel Christian Academy (Connecticut) — Newington, Connecticut
Emmanuel Christian Academy (North Carolina) — Leland, North Carolina
Emmanuel Christian Academy (Ohio) — Springfield, Ohio

Elsewhere
Emmanuel Christian Academy, Jamaica